Stenoma meyeriana is a moth in the family Depressariidae. It was described by Caspar Stoll in 1781. It is found in the Guianas.

References

Moths described in 1781
Stenoma